Gourav Guin Memorial College, also known as Chandrakona Road College, established in 2008, is a college in Chandrakona Road, in Paschim Medinipur district. It offers undergraduate courses in arts and Social sciences. It is affiliated to  Vidyasagar University.

Departments

Arts (CBCS)

Bengali (Honours and General)
English (Honours and General)
History (Honours and General)
Political Science (Honours and General)
Education (Honours and General)
 Sanskrit (General)

See also

References

External links
Gourav Guin Memorial College, Chandrakona Road
Vidyasagar University
University Grants Commission
National Assessment and Accreditation Council

Universities and colleges in Paschim Medinipur district
Colleges affiliated to Vidyasagar University
Educational institutions established in 2008
2008 establishments in West Bengal